"Shortie like Mine" is a song by rapper Bow Wow. Released on October 3, 2006, it is the first single from his fifth studio album, The Price of Fame (2006). This song features American R&B singers Chris Brown & Johntá Austin. The video ranked at number 19 on BET's Notarized: Top 100 Videos of 2006 countdown. The video also received a BET Award nomination for Viewer's Choice in 2007.

Critical reception
Allmusic's David Jeffries praised the song by highlighting and stated: "Saving the album from being a disaster is perfectly acceptable single; 'Shortie Like Mine' which swaggers with a great hook."

Music video
The music video was filmed in September, 2006, and premiered on BET's Access Granted on October 23, 2006. It was the New Joint on BET's 106 & Park a day later on October 24, 2006. The video for "Shortie Like Mine" has a MySpace theme and was earlier made as a praise record to Ciara. The video features Canadian singer-actress Keshia Chanté and Angela Simmons, the daughter of Rev Run, as well as Rev Run himself. Chris Brown appears in the video, but Johntá Austin does not. The song's producer, Jermaine Dupri, also makes an appearance.

Chart performance
The single debuted at number eighty on the Billboard Hot 100 on October 21, 2006, being the top debut of that week. The song later peaked at number nine on the week of December 16, 2006. It also peaked at number two on the Billboard Hot R&B/Hip-Hop Songs and number one on the Billboard Hot Rap Tracks. The single debuted on BET's 106 & Park chart at number ten on October 17, 2006, just two days after its premiere (excluding weekends). The song was Bow Wow's third to reach the top ten on the Hot 100. It was Brown's fourth. It also peaked at number two in New Zealand and was certified Gold on August 23, 2009, selling over 7,500 copies.

Charts

Weekly charts

Year-end charts

Certifications

See also
 List of Billboard number-one rap singles of the 2000s

References

2006 singles
2006 songs
Bow Wow (rapper) songs
Chris Brown songs
Columbia Records singles
Song recordings produced by Jermaine Dupri
Songs written by Johntá Austin
Songs written by Bryan-Michael Cox
Songs written by Jermaine Dupri
Music videos directed by Bryan Barber
Songs written by Da Brat